Greg Kennedy (born 15 April 1976) is an Irish hurler who played as a left corner-back for the Galway senior team.  

Kennedy joined the team during the 1996 championship and subsequently became a regular member of the starting fifteen until his retirement after the 2007 championship. During that time he won four consecutive Connacht medals.

At club level Kennedy is a one-time Connacht medalist with Loughrea. He has also won one county club championship medal.

On 11 May 2019, Kennedy was part of the Dublin back-room team for the 2019 Leinster Senior Hurling Championship match against Kilkenny. He was on the field as a runner in the first half when he intercepted a quickly-taken TJ Reid free by catching the ball and throwing it back to Reid.			
He was handed a proposed four-week ban for his actions.

References

1976 births
Living people
Loughrea hurlers
Galway inter-county hurlers
Connacht inter-provincial hurlers